The New Coalition Academy was a column in Private Eye that depicted the UK coalition government led by David Cameron and Nick Clegg as if they were in fact taking over a failing school.  The first episode  explained that "Brown's Comprehensive" had been replaced by the Academy, and the new motto is "Duo in Uno" (Latin for "Two in One").

From May 2015 the academy was renamed the "Cameron Free School", reflecting the Conservative majority government.

In July 2016 the school was renamed "St Theresa's Independent State Grammar School for Girls (and Boys)". Following the 2017 General Election, the school incorporated the William III Orange Academy, in reference to the confidence and supply deal that the Democratic Unionist Party reached with the second ministry of Theresa May.

Style
It commonly includes a Headmaster's Message, though that is sometimes substituted by a message from the Deputy Head. The Deputy Head's Message is often cut short due to "insufficient space". Since 2016, the Deputy Head's Message has been replaced by The Bursar Writes..., this too is often cut short, however.

"Pupils" are invariably referred to by their surname, for example Nick Ferrari is "Ferrari, N" and Danny Finkelstein is "Finkelstein, D" who contributes jokes.

Sports events such as The Ashes are referenced through the school's sports teams (the First XI or First XV). Defence-related news is  referenced through the school's Combined Cadet Force and the school submarine.

Characters 2010–15
 David Cameron is the Headmaster.
 Nick Clegg is the Deputy Headmaster.
 Miriam Clegg is the wife of the Deputy Headmaster who does not want her children to go to the Academy, but instead to private schools.
 George Osborne is the Bursar.
 Danny Alexander is his assistant.
 Vince Cable is the Head of Business Studies.
 John Bercow is the Head of the Debating Society.
 Rupert Murdoch is a school financier and Rebekah Brooks is his caretaker.
 Andy Coulson was a miscreant student who the Headmaster put on the school switchboard for a time.
 Anna Soubry teaches in the Military Studies department.
 Chris Grayling was the Careers Master who was promoted to become Head of Discipline.
 Boris Johnson is a personal friend of the Headmaster who is considered to be a potential Headmaster and therefore is constantly discredited by the Headmaster.
 Liam Fox was the head of the CCF, who got into trouble for allowing his personal friend Adam Werritty to appear in his classroom without authorisation.
 David Davis is a former member of staff who attempted to become Headmaster.
 Theresa May is Head of Discipline.
 Michael Gove is the Curriculum Director, often on the "naughty chair".
 Lord Coe is the Head of Physical Education who was charged with organising the Sports Day.
 Dennis Skinner is an old school retainer.
 Chris Huhne was the head of Environmental Studies who has resigned.  He was in an affair with his secretary Carina Trimmingham.
 Ed Davey is the new head of Environmental Studies.
 Andrew Lansley is in charge of reorganising the Sanitorium who has now gone on leave.
 Rowan Williams was known as Reverend Beardie and is the chaplain of the Academy until his departure in December and replacement by Justin Welby (Reverend Oilwellby), who used to run the local petrol station.
 Jeremy Hunt was the head of Media Studies and has been reassigned to running the sanitorium, where he intends to put satellite dishes on the roof.
 Andrew Mitchell is the head of Staff Discipline who got into trouble for losing his temper at some school security guards.  He was later forced to resign.
 Justin Welby is the school chaplain.
 Justine Greening is a teacher who is opposed to the opening of a third driveway in the school on the grounds that she lived too close to it.
 Nadine Dorries is a teacher who wanted to mount a dartboard at the school Curry House.
 Lynton Crosby is an attack dog bought by the headmaster from his old friend Mr. Johnson to be a key part of the Senior Staff Management Directive team.
 Iain Duncan Smith is the new Careers Master.
 Ed Miliband is a supply teacher.
 Fraser Nelson is a Year 12 student who is Secretary of the Politics Society.
 Phillip Schofield and Holly Willoughby are members of the Sixth Form Media Studies Group.
 Owen Paterson is Head of Catering.
 Eric Pickles is a teacher who ate most of the Christmas dinner.
 Nigel Farage is a teacher who dislikes teaching about Europe.  He also runs the fruitcake stall in the school.
 Maria Miller is Head of Cultural Studies.
 Nick Boles is Head of Planning.
 Malcolm Rifkind is Head of Intelligence Testing.
 Nick Ferrari is a student who runs the Sixth Form Media Service.
 Simon Hughes is a teacher who commonly attempts to undermine the Deputy Headmaster.
 Steve Hilton used to work in the Headmaster's Office, as Head of Blue Skies Thinking.  He has moved to California to teach and has criticised the Headmaster.
 Oliver Letwin is a teacher who forged an agreement with the Deputy Headmaster on how to regulate the school magazine.
 Abu Qatada is a Year 7 Student that the Admissions Secretary is trying to expel.
 Eric Joyce is a supply teacher who got in trouble for starting a drunken brawl in the tuck shop.
 Roy Hodgson is the coach of the 1st XI who played matches in Poland and Ukraine.
 Bob Diamond is the local bank manager.
 Anish Kapoor is a Year 7 student who has made a sculpture for the Sports Day.

Characters 2015–16 
 Nicola Sturgeon runs a shortbread stall.
 Alex Salmond is her assistant.
 Jeremy Corbyn  is a classroom assistant.  
 Grant Shapps is a teacher who was forced to leave after accusations of bullying.
 Andy Murray is a pupil who captain's the school tennis squad.

Characters 2016 onwards
 Theresa May is the Headmistress.
 Philip May is the Headmistress's husband.
 Philip Hammond is the bursar.
 Angela Merkel is the Headmistress of Vorsprung Durch Technikal Kollege.
 Francois Hollande is the Headmaster of Grande Ecole de la Récession.
 Jeremy Corbyn is still a teaching assistant.
 John Redwood is Mr. Deadwood, a teacher complaining about the new Brexit Fudge before tasting it.
 Iain Duncan Smith is Mr. Ian Dunce Smith, a teacher complaining about the new Brexit Fudge before tasting it.
 Justine Greening is the Head of Educational Standards. She left her position after being offered a new job as Head of the Stationery Cupboard.
 Jeremy Hunt remains in charge of the sanatorium which is often closed due to Dr Junior's unwillingness to work.
 Sir Alan Duncan is a teacher who is placed in charge of school paper clips.
 Vladimir Putin is the Headmaster of the Kremlin School of Advanced Intelligence.
 Barack Obama is the Headmaster of the Washington Drone Academy.
 Boris Johnson is placed in charge of the school whilst the Headmistress is on holiday. He is also the Head of Foreign Studies. 
 David Davis shares the school accommodation with Boris Johnson.
 Liam Fox shares the school accommodation "Squabbling House" with Johnson and Davis.
 David Cameron is the former Headmaster.
 Michael Gove is a former teacher at the school, who was recently fired. Following the results of the School Debate, he was rehired.
 George Osborne is the former school bursar who has gone back to live with his parents.
 Nicky Morgan is the former head of the school curriculum, who now wanders around the grounds.
 Shinzo Abe is the Headmaster of the Advanced Kamikaze Institute.
 Ban Ki-moon is the head of the United Nations of Headmasters.
 George Hollingbery is a junior staff member.
 Steve Hilton is a former teaching assistant to David Cameron.
 Peter Bone is one of the eldest teachers.
 Nick Timothy is Mrs May's adviser. He was sacked following the result of the School Debate.
 Donald Tusk is in charge of the seating plan at the European Education Union.
 Ed Balls is a competitor in Very Strictly Come Dancing.
 Zac Goldsmith is a teacher who failed his audition for the role on Mayor of London in the school panto, before leaving the school entirely.
 Michael Heseltine is a former deputy Head, described as "the worst Headmaster we never had." He's also currently in trouble with the RSPCA for strangling his dog.
 Carol Vorderman was the winner of the school's maths prize in 1976.
 Stephen Hawking was the Head of Astrophysics from 1900 to 1943.
 Mark Carney is the local bank manager who was caught in a conspiracy to blow up the school.
 Gina Miller is a self-appointed Health & Safety Representative.
 Nigel Farage no longer runs the school's fruitcake stall, as he is now the First Locker-Room Banter-Buddy to Donald Trump. He is also known as Mr Farago, or Mr Far-Right.
 Donald Trump is the Headmaster of the Washington Shutdown Finance College.
 Beata Szydło is the Headmistress of the Warsaw Academy of Building and Plumbing Sciences.
 Fiona Hill is the Headmistress's secretary. She was sacked following the result of the School Debate
 Chris Grayling is the head of school transport.
 Sir Ivan Rogers worked on the school's Outreach Programme who had to resign.
 Nicola Sturgeon is Nicola Krankie, the Headmistress of the Never-Will-Be-Independent School in Edinburgh. She does still run the shortbread stall.
 Recep Erdoğan is the Headmaster of the Turkish School of Extremely Hard Knocks.
 Kenneth Clarke is one of the older teachers at the school.
 Chloe Smith is the former assistant in the Bursar's office.
 Samantha Cameron is SamCam Cameron, the wife of the former Headmaster.
 John Bercow is a moderator of the Debating Society.
 Sarah Vine is a member of the Sixth Form Fashion Society. Her favourite teacher is Michael Gove.
 Paul Nuttall helps run the fruitcake stall. He is also known as Mr Nutter or Mr Nutcase. Following the collapse of the stall after the School Debate, he put the stall up for sale.
 Douglas Carswell helps run the fruitcake stall. He is also known as Mr Wonky-Jaw and Mr Carcrash. He sought to rejoin the teaching staff after developing a nut allergy, but eventually settled for setting up his own nut stall.
 Michael Crick is a member of the Sixth Form Media Society.
 Jacob Rees-Mogg is the TeachFirst Classics Master assistant.
 Nick Robinson is a member of the Debating Society.
 Eddie Mair is a member of the Debating Society.
 Geordie Greig is a member of the Sixth Form Media Society.
 Lynton Crosby is the school's attack dog. Following the results of the School Debate, he was put down.
 Alex Jones interviewed the Headmistress on "The One-derful Headmistress Show."
 Matt Baker interviewed the Headmistress on "The One-derful Headmistress Show."
 Ed Miliband is a supply teacher.
 Andrew Neil is a student who interviewed the Headmistress during the School Debate.
 Robert Peston is a student who tested Boris Johnson during the School Debate.
 Damian Green is a friend of the Headmistress from Oxford. He was later sacked from his position.
 Arlene Foster is the Head of Music, as well as the Head of Biblical History, Sex Education, and the school's energy supply. She has also taken over the Headmistresses's office.
 Emmanuel Macron is the Headmaster of the Académie Nouveau Napoleon.
 Elizabeth II is the school's patron.
 Ruth Davidson is the Honorary Commander of the Combined Cadet Force.
 Andrew Mitchell is a teacher who was overheard saying that the Headmistress should resign following the results of the School Debate.
 Robbie Gibb is the Headmistresses's assistant.
 Amber Rudd is a teacher who is very loyal to the Headmistress and touted as a potential successor.
 Geoffrey Boycott is the former 1st XI batsman.
 Michael Fallon was a member of staff who had to stand down for undisclosed reasons.
 Priti Patel was a member of staff who had to stand down after having secret meetings with Israeli headmasters.
 Gavin Williamson is a teacher who runs the CCF after being promoted for 'successfully' making sure that no teachers were involved in any scandals. He also has a pet tarantula, Cronos.
 Penny Mordaunt is a teacher well known for her use of the school's diving board.
 Stephen Hammond is a teacher who was fired after voting against the Headmistress in the Big School Debate.
 Toby Young was the new watchdog for higher standards in education, known for his sense of humour. He was fired before taking up his position.
 Andrew Adonis was an advisor to the Headmistress on School Infrastructure, but he resigned from his post.
 Tracey Crouch is the Minister for Loneliness, who needs to see the Headmistress frequently.
 Henry Bolton runs the fruitcake stall, but his extra-fruity fruitcakes are not popular with students.
 Desmond Swayne is a teacher who fell asleep while Kenneth Clarke talked  about leaving the European Education Union.
 Ben Bradley is the new Head of Sixth Form, but may have to leave his position due to some poor jokes.

References

External links
 Private Eye – The New Coalition Academy

Private Eye
Satirical columns
Cultural depictions of British prime ministers
Cultural depictions of politicians
Cultural depictions of British men
Nick Clegg
Parodies of Donald Trump
Cultural depictions of Vladimir Putin
Cultural depictions of Stephen Hawking
Cultural depictions of Barack Obama
Cultural depictions of Angela Merkel
Cultural depictions of David Cameron
Cultural depictions of Rupert Murdoch